Denmark competed at the 2014 Summer Youth Olympics, in Nanjing, China from 16 August to 28 August 2014.

Medalists
Medals awarded to participants of mixed-NOC (Combined) teams are represented in italics. These medals are not counted towards the individual NOC medal tally.

Athletics

Qualification Legend: Q=Final A (medal); qB=Final B (non-medal); qC=Final C (non-medal); qD=Final D (non-medal); qE=Final E (non-medal)

Boys
Track & road events

Girls
Track & road events

Note: Ranks in the heats-phase refer to the overall rank across all heats.

Badminton

Denmark qualified one athlete based on the 2 May 2014 BWF Junior World Rankings.

Singles

Doubles

Canoeing

Denmark qualified one boat based on its performance at the 2013 World Junior Canoe Sprint and Slalom Championships.

Cycling

Denmark qualified a boys' and girls' team based on its ranking issued by the UCI.

Team

Mixed Relay

Golf

Denmark qualified one team of two athletes based on the 8 June 2014 IGF Combined World Amateur Golf Rankings.

Individual

Team

Rowing

Denmark qualified one boat based on its performance at the 2013 World Rowing Junior Championships.

Qualification Legend: FA=Final A (medal); FB=Final B (non-medal); FC=Final C (non-medal); FD=Final D (non-medal); SA/B=Semifinals A/B; SC/D=Semifinals C/D; R=Repechage

Shooting

Denmark was given a wild card to compete.

Individual

Team

Triathlon

Denmark qualified two athletes based on its performance at the 2014 European Youth Olympic Games Qualifier.

Individual

Relay

References

2014 in Danish sport
Nations at the 2014 Summer Youth Olympics
Denmark at the Youth Olympics